You Are Everything I Need is the fifth album by American pop singer/songwriter/pianist Larry Santos, released in 1976 on Casablanca Records. This follow-up also features "Early in the Morning", I Don't Know Why", a cover of Linda Ronstadt's 1970 tune, "Long, Long Time", written by Gary White and "We Can't Hide It Anymore". It was also produced by Detroit soul producer Don Davis.

Track listing

All songs written by Larry Santos except where noted.

"You Are Everything I Need"
"If I Never See Mary Again" (Larry Santos, Dan Yessian)
"I Don't Know Why"
"Loving Woman"
"We Can't Hide It Anymore" (Barry Murphy)
"Long, Long Time" (Gary White)
"Early in the Morning"
"Can't Get You Off My Mind" (Iran Koster, Teddy Randazzo, Victoria Pike)
"Meet Me Tonight" (Teddy Randazzo, Iran Koster, Victoria Pike)

Notes
On the original L.P., track 4 was originally "Lovin' Woman"
On the original L.P., track 7 was originally "Early in the Mornin'"

Personnel

Keyboards - Barry Beckett, Larry Santos, Earl Van Dyke, Rudy Robinson
Guitar - Bobby Goodsite, Eddie Hinton, Eddie Willis, Jimmy Johnson, Robert White, Norman Warner, Pete Carr
Bass - David Hood, Roderick Chandler, Patrick Burrows
Drums - Roger Hawkins, Ken Krogol, Richard Allen
ARP Synthesizer - Larry Santos
Backing Vocals - Honey
Arranged by - Bobby Eaton
Art Direction and Design by Gribbitt!
Engineer - Ellis Bishop
Engineer, Remix - Jim Vitti, Ken Sands
Mastered by Allen Zentz
Photography by Gerald Farber
Produced and remixed by Don Davis
Strings arranged by Detroit Fisher Theatre Strings
Horns arranged by Carl Austin

External links
http://www.discogs.com/Larry-Santos-You-Are-Everything-I-Need/master/443398
http://larrysantos.bandcamp.com/you-are-everything-i-need

Casablanca Records albums
Albums produced by Don Davis (record producer)
1976 albums
Larry Santos albums
Pop albums by American artists
Easy listening albums